This is the progression of world record improvements of the high jump of Masters athletics.

Key

IAAF includes indoor marks in the record list since 2000, but WMA does not follow that practice.

Men 35

Men 40

Men 45

Men 50

Men 55

Men 60

Men 65

Men 70

Men 75

Men 80

Men 85

Men 90

Men 95

Men 100

References

External links
 World Masters Rankings up to 2012
 World Masters Athletic Rankings from 2013
 Absolute Age Records Open Class
 Absolute Age Records
 Actual Masters World Records (outdoor)
 Actual Masters World Records (indoor)

Masters athletics world record progressions
High jump